Kananyevskaya is a rural locality (a village) in Nikolskoye Rural Settlement, Kaduysky District, Vologda Oblast, Russia. The population was 11 as of 2002.

Geography 
Kananyevskaya is located 62 km northwest of Kaduy (the district's administrative centre) by road. Krestovaya is the nearest rural locality.

References 

Rural localities in Kaduysky District